Poženik is a village in the Municipality of Cerklje na Gorenjskem in the Upper Carniola region of Slovenia.

References

External links

Poženik on Geopedia

Populated places in the Municipality of Cerklje na Gorenjskem